Hyman G. Rickover may refer to:

Admiral Rickover
Hyman G. Rickover (1900–1986), a U.S. naval admiral responsible for the development of naval nuclear propulsion, and also known as the "Father of the Nuclear Navy"
USS Hyman G. Rickover (SSN-709), a U.S. Navy Los Angeles class nuclear submarine named after a U.S. admiral

Science fiction
Rickover nuclear reactor, a U.S. Navy nuclear reactor used in the science fiction novel Red Mars in the Mars trilogy series by Kim Stanley Robinson